The River Stour is an English river that rises in the county of Oxfordshire but largely flows through Warwickshire. It is a tributary of the Avon, which it joins just south west of Stratford-upon-Avon.

The source of the River Stour is a spring near Highways Farm, just south of Swalcliffe. Some  to the west, it crosses the Oxfordshire/Warwickshire border near Traitor's Ford. The first settlement that the river flows through is the village of Stourton. The River Stour then turns to the north and passes through the town of Shipston-on-Stour. The A3400 road roughly follows the course of the river to Stratford-upon-Avon, through the villages of Tredington Halford, Alderminster, Newbold-on-Stour, Atherstone-on-Stour and Clifford Chambers.

See also
Rivers of the United Kingdom

External links
 

Stour
Stour
1Stour